Antônio Prado is a municipality in the state of Rio Grande do Sul, Brazil. It is surrounded by the municipalities Ipê, Flores da Cunha, Vila Flores, Nova Roma do Sul, São Marcos, Nova Pádua, and Protásio Alves. It is 184 km from Porto Alegre.

The town is named in honor of Antônio da Silva Prado, who planned the Italian immigration to Brazil.
It contains the most important ensemble of architecture built by Italian Brazilians. The Talian language, (of Venetian origin), gastronomy and architecture are the most important aspects of Antônio Prado’s culture.

In the town’s Historical Center it is possible to see 48 houses built in wood and masonry. They were landmarked by the Instituto do Patrimônio Histórico e Artístico Nacional (IPHAN, The Brazilian National Historical and Artistical Heritage Institute) and serve to prove the care with which they were built, and later preserved by the descendants of those immigrants.   But the preservation of the roots of the Italian colonization is not limited to the landmarking of the architectural group. In Antônio Prado, the residents keep the traditions of their ancestors alive, through choral singing, industrial arts, and gastronomy.

The municipality is also an eco-tourism destination, with beautiful waterfalls inside the araucaria forest. The natural beauties are also present in that destination, attracting an increasing number of visitors and practisers of adventure sports; who find perfect places for their practice there. Among the most common activities in the surroundings of this town are rappel and whitewater rafting.

See also
List of municipalities in Rio Grande do Sul

References

Municipalities in Rio Grande do Sul